Bernhard Neininger (born 19 October 1955) is a retired Swiss professional ice hockey forward who played for HC La Chaux-de-Fonds and EHC Arosa in the National League A. He also represented the Swiss national team at the 1976 Winter Olympics.

References

External links

1955 births
Living people
EHC Arosa players
HC La Chaux-de-Fonds players
Ice hockey players at the 1976 Winter Olympics
Olympic ice hockey players of Switzerland
Swiss ice hockey right wingers